Lina Elisabeth Bäcklin (born 3 October 1994) is a Swedish retired ice hockey defenceman.

International career
Bäcklin was selected for the Sweden women's national ice hockey team in the 2014 Winter Olympics. She played in all six games, not recording a point.

As of 2014, Bäcklin has also appeared for Sweden at one IIHF Women's World Championships, in 2013.

Bäcklin made three appearances for the Sweden women's national under-18 ice hockey team, at the IIHF World Women's U18 Championships, with the first in 2010. This included winning bronze medals in 2010 and 2012.

Bäcklin also appeared at the 2012 Winter Youth Olympics, winning gold as a part of the Swedish team at that event.

Career statistics
Through 2013–14 season

References

External links
 
 
 

1994 births
Living people
Brynäs IF Dam players
Ice hockey players at the 2014 Winter Olympics
Olympic ice hockey players of Sweden
People from Gävle
Swedish women's ice hockey defencemen
Ice hockey players at the 2012 Winter Youth Olympics
Youth Olympic gold medalists for Sweden
Sportspeople from Gävleborg County